Paul Costa (born October 11, 1959) is an American accountant and politician who served as a member of the Pennsylvania House of Representatives representing the 34th District from 1999 to 2018. He was defeated in the 2018 Democratic primary by progressive challenger Summer Lee.

Early life and education
Costa was born on October 11, 1959 to Jay Sr. (once Allegheny County treasurer) and Louise Costa. One of six children, he has a brother, Jay Jr., who was state senator for the 43rd district.

He graduated from Taylor Allderdice High School in 1978 in the same class as Gary Graff and Maxine Lapiduss. He then studied at Community College of Allegheny County, where he obtained an Associate degree in 1988, and at Point Park College, earning a B.S. in Accounting in 1994.

Career 
He served on the Wilkins Township board of commissioners for three years, including one year as board president, and worked in the Allegheny County prothonotary's office for over two decades. Vice-chairman of the Wilkins Township Democratic Committee since 1992, Costa served as an alternate delegate to that year's Democratic National Convention, which nominated Bill Clinton. He is also a member of the parish council of St. Colman Catholic Church in Turtle Creek.

References

External links
Pennsylvania House of Representatives - Paul Costa official PA House website

Pennsylvania House Democratic Caucus - Rep. Frank Dermody official Party website

Members of the Pennsylvania House of Representatives
1959 births
Living people
Politicians from Pittsburgh
Point Park University alumni
21st-century American politicians
20th-century American politicians